St Andrew's Church, Ham, is a Grade II listed Church of England church on Church Road, Ham Common in Ham in the London Borough of Richmond upon Thames.

Architecture
The church was built in grey brick in 1830–31; the architect was Edward Lapidge. A south aisle with a rose window, designed by Raphael Brandon, was added in 1860, and a chancel in red brick, by Bodley & Garner, in 1900–01. The carvings of the screen and choir stalls are by John Harper.

The church has 32 windows; eleven with stained glass installed between 1901 and 1948, four of which are by Shrigley & Hunt. The three-light window at the west end by Hugh Ray Easton, installed in 1932, shows Saint Andrew in the centre, flanked by scenes of baptism and confirmation. The east window of the Crucifixion was designed by Sir Ninian Comper (1900) and was erected in memory of Harry Scott of Ancrum (d 1889) by his stepdaughters Violet Cavendish-Bentinck and Hyacinth Jessup. Surrounding the high altar are eight large paintings of prophets and evangelists.

There is a memorial stained glass window to Sir George Dance (1857–1932), a dramatist and theatrical manager, and his son Erik who died in a prison camp in World War II.

There are also funerary hatchments at the back of the church dedicated to Lionel Tollemache, 4th Earl of Dysart and his wife Countess Grace.

Notable interments
 Carlos Bovill OBE (1882–1938), a balloonist in World War I.
 Violet Hyacinth Bowes-Lyon (1882–1893), who died of diphtheria at Forbes House on Ham Common. Her father was Claude George Bowes-Lyon, 14th Earl of Strathmore and Kinghorne and she was the elder sister of Elizabeth Bowes-Lyon, The Queen Mother.
 General William Eden (1768–1851), army officer who was awarded a gold medal at the capture of Java from the Dutch in 1811; he lived on Ham Common where Martingales Close is now built.
 Joshua Field JP (1829–1904), Deputy Lieutenant for Surrey, who lived at Latchmere House, son of Joshua Field FRS.
 Wilfred Hudleston Hudleston (1828–1909), English geologist whose epitaph records "An eminent scientist whose work and research did much towards the advancement of geology".
 Major Robert Bartholomew Lawes (1824–1907), hereditary Constable of Dover Castle and Lord Warden of the Cinque Ports.
 Sir Coutts Lindsay, 2nd Baronet (1824–1913), artist and watercolourist.
 Captain Lauchlan Bellingham Mackinnon (1815–1877), captain in the Royal Navy who wrote three books about his experiences.
 John Minter Morgan (1782–1854),  author and philanthropist who founded the National Orphan Home on Ham Common in 1849.
 Sir Richard Owen (1804–1892), biologist, comparative anatomist and paleontologist. 
 Charles Gottlieb Pfander (1803–1865) of the Church Missionary Society. His epitaph reads that he was "a leading champion in the great controversy between Christianity and Mahommedanism."
 Admiral Sir Peter Richards KCB (1787–1869), Royal Navy officer who went on to be Third Sea Lord.
 Frederick G Rudler (1887–1936), twice Mayor of the City of Westminster 1933–1935. There is bust of him in the Richmond Reference Library.
 Henry Warren Scott, the son of Sir William Scott, 6th Baronet, of Ancrum who died on 23 August 1889 at Forbes House; his wife, Louisa Scott (1832-1918) was the maternal grandmother of Queen Elizabeth The Queen Mother and the great-grandmother of Elizabeth II.
 Hugh Colin Smith (1836–1910), Governor of the Bank of England from 1897 to 1899.
 Sarah Smith (1832–1911),  writer of children's books under the pen name Hesba Stretton.
 Charles Smyth Vereker (1818–1885), Commandant of the Limerick Artillery Militia, author of 'Scenes in the Sunny South' (1871) about Algeria, and the novel 'The Child of the Desert' (1878). He was the son of Charles Vereker, 2nd Viscount Gort and Elizabeth, his second wife, who is also buried here.

The cemetery also contains the graves of three war dead: Irene Daisy Collett of the Women's Auxiliary Air Force (d 1943), Ronald Oswald Dibben of the Royal Air Force Volunteer Reserve (d 1942) and William Samuel Hudson Palmer of the Royal Flying Corps (d 1917). Also the grave of Dr. Frederick Carson who was a captain in the R.A.M.C. in WW1 and was awarded the Military Cross in 1918.

Members of the Shafto family are buried in the cemetery.

Activities
The church has a service on Sunday mornings, a Sunday School for children between the ages of 3 to 11 years and a youth group for older children.

On the initiative of a German-speaking congregation established in 1979 by parents of pupils attending the German School nearby in Petersham, Lutheran services in the German language have been held at St Andrew's since 1980. The services are held twice a month on Sunday afternoons, with a concurrent Sunday school. There are also regularly scheduled ecumenical services shared by the Anglican St Andrew's congregation and the German-speaking Catholic congregation (which holds services at St Thomas Aquinas, Ham).

Gallery

Church interior

Church exterior

Churchyard tombs

References

External links
 

1830s establishments in England
Ham
Ham
Churches in Ham, London
Commonwealth War Graves Commission cemeteries in England
Edward Lapidge church buildings
Grade II listed churches in the London Borough of Richmond upon Thames
History of the London Borough of Richmond upon Thames